Alta Sierra is an unincorporated community in the Kern County, California.

References

Unincorporated communities in Kern County, California
Greenhorn Mountains
Populated places in the Sierra Nevada (United States)
Unincorporated communities in California